Mollalı or Mollaly may refer to:
Mollalı, Barda, Azerbaijan
Mollalı, Jalilabad, Azerbaijan
Mollalı, Oghuz, Azerbaijan
Mollalı, Qubadli, Azerbaijan